Odontarthria tropica is a species of snout moth in the genus Odontarthria. It was described by Roesler in 1983, and is known from Sumatra (including Dolok Merangir, the type locality).

References

Moths described in 1983
Phycitinae